St. Petersburg Institute of International Economic Relations, Economics and Law (IIEREL) – IVESEP is an independent institution of higher education in St. Petersburg, Russia. Established in 1994 by the interregional public organization “ZNANIE Society in St. Petersburg and Leningrad Oblast”.

Overview 
IVESEP-IIEREL is headquartered in St. Petersburg in a 19th-century palace built for Princess Zinaida Ivanovna Yusupova (42 Liteiny Prospekt). More than 80% of the professors of IIEREL are doctors and candidates. IIEREL is involved in the Bologna process.

Organisation 
The Institute consists of six faculties: Economics, Humanities, International Relations, Law, Second Degree, and Part Time Training Department. The faculties train students in finance, world economics, accounting, management, transportation and logistics, public relations, linguistics, psychology, international relations (worldwide organisations), cultural studies (Europe, Baltic region), criminology, public law and public governance.

IIEREL also has several master programmes in law and economics and frequently prepares PhD students for defence of their theses in economics and law.

Affiliates 
IVESEP has a wide network of branches in Leningrad Oblast (Boksitogorsk, Gatchina, Kingisepp, Luga, Podporozhye, Volkhov, Vyborg), Moscow and Moscow Oblast (Naro-Fominsk), cities in Russia (Kaliningrad, Khabarovsk, Kirov, Krasnodar, Krasnoyarsk, Novokuznetsk, Novosibirsk, Perm, Togliatti, Smolensk a.o.), as well as abroad — in Armenia’s capital Yerevan. There are more than 20 000 students study in the affiliates of the IIEREL.

References

External links 
 

Universities in Saint Petersburg
History of Russia (1991–present)
Economics schools